There Are Debts is an album by David Hopkins, released in December 2010.  It was produced by Matt Fish.  All songs were written by David Hopkins.  Strings and horns were arranged by David Hopkins.

To promote the album, David Hopkins performed live on Today with Pat Kenny on 4 April 2011.  He also performed live on PBS' Vegas In Tune.

Critical reaction

The record was released to largely positive critical and fan reaction. Hot Press gave the record 4/5 stars, calling it "one helluva album" and stated regarding the title track that it is "a stunning track, superbly underpinned by sombre piano and brass".  The Sunday Times also gave the record 4/5 stars and wrote that it is "sweet and tuneful" and commented that "his harmonious duet with Laura Jansen...is a triumph" and a "stunningly beautiful ballad".  The Irish Times declared that the album had "several shining examples of nigh-on perfect songcraft here" though it only gave the album 3/5 stars.  Las Vegas Weekly called Hopkins "an Ace singer-songwriter" and also gave the album 4/5 stars. RTÉ Radio 1 made it "Album of the Week".  Las Vegas Citylife called it "unbelievably catchy - you'll be singing along by the second chorus of most tracks - and despite the sad parts, There Are Debts makes you feel all warm inside."

Track listing
"I Want Your Love"  – 3:44 
"When I Was Young"  – 4:22 
"There Are Debts (featuring Damien Rice)"  – 3:26 
"Stay Here"  – 3:50 
"Angels in the Satellites"  – 4:19 
"God You're Letting Me Down"  – 3:19 
"Money"  – 3:53 
"In the Country"  – 3:25 
"Dublin (featuring Laura Jansen) "  – 4:15
"Shape of Things"  – 4:14 
"Igloo"  – 1:14

Personnel
David Hopkins– vocals, acoustic guitar, piano, Hammond, rhodes, synths, mellotron, bells
Zamo Riffman - guitar, backing vocals
Brett Simons (of Brian Wilson's band) – electric bass, acoustic bass
Aaron Sterling - percussion, drums
Damien Rice - guest vocals
Laura Jansen - guest vocals, backing vocals
Jack Hopkins - backing vocals
Amy Kuney - backing vocals
Beth Thornley - backing vocals
Matt Fish - cello
Jared-Matt Greenberg - trumpet
Danny Levin - trumpet, euphonium, trombone
David Moyer - tenor saxophone, baritone saxophone
Brando Triantafillou - additional guitar, additional drums
Daphne Chen, Marisa Kuney, Melissa Reiner, Jenny Takamatsu, Amy Wickman, and Alwyn Wright - violin
Charlie Hebenstreit and Karolina Nemieniec - viola

References

External links
 David Hopkins official site

2010 albums
David Hopkins (musician) albums